Pseudagrion spernatum, the Natal sprite, is a species of damselfly in the family Coenagrionidae. It is found in Angola, the Democratic Republic of the Congo, Ethiopia, Kenya, Malawi, Mozambique, South Africa, Tanzania, Uganda, Zambia, Zimbabwe, possibly Burundi, and possibly the Republic of the Congo. Its natural habitats are subtropical or tropical moist montane forests, subtropical or tropical high-altitude shrubland, and rivers.

References

Coenagrionidae
Insects described in 1881
Taxonomy articles created by Polbot